Graham Keith Ernst (born 16 March 1940) is a former Australian trade unionist and politician. He was an Australian Labor Party member of the Parliament of Victoria from 1979 to 1992.

Biography

Ernst was born in Yorketown, South Australia, to Frederick Ernst, a farmer, and Leta Grace Bittner. He attended state schools in Cranbrook and Portland before becoming a fitter and turner at the Portland Superphosphate Works, where he was elected as shop steward for the Amalgamated Metal Workers Union (AMWU). He also worked as the manager of a bakery and operated an engineering workshop in Portland. Heavily involved in the union movement, Ernst was founding junior vice-president of the South West Trades and Labour Council and president of the local branch of the AMWU. 

In 1973 Ernst moved to Geelong where he became president of the Geelong branch of the AMWU (now renamed the Amalgamated Metal Workers and Shipwrights Union) and junior vice-president of the Geelong Trades Hall Council. In 1979 he was elected to the Victorian Legislative Assembly as Labor member for Geelong East, moving to Bellarine in 1985 following his old seat's abolition. He was defeated in 1992.

References

 

1940 births
Living people
Australian Labor Party members of the Parliament of Victoria
Members of the Victorian Legislative Assembly